Kiribati competed at the 2022 Commonwealth Games at Birmingham, England from 28 July to 8 August 2022. It was the team's seventh appearance at the Games.

Kiribati's team consisted of six male athletes competing in three sports.

Competitors
The following is the list of number of competitors participating at the Games per sport/discipline.

Athletics

As of 2 June 2022, one athlete will take part in the competition.

Men
Track and road events

Boxing

A squad of four boxers was selected as of 27 June 2022.

Men

Weightlifting

One weightlifter qualified through his position in the IWF Commonwealth Ranking List (as of 9 March 2022).

References

External links
Kiribati National Olympic Committee Facebook site

Nations at the 2022 Commonwealth Games
2022
2022 in Kiribati sport